Malacca is a state in Malaysia.

Malacca may also refer to:

Places
 Malacca City or Malacca Town, the capital of the state of Malacca, which is recognised as UNESCO World Heritage site
 Malacca River, which flows through Malacca City
 Malacca Island, a man-made island
 Malacca Sultanate, an early sultanate based in the Malacca area
 Strait of Malacca, a major waterway separating Malaya and Sumatra
 Crown Colony of Malacca, formed in 1946 and merged with the Federation of Malaya after gaining independence from the United Kingdom in 1957
 Malacca, the tourist name for the village U-rèk-ka on Car Nicobar, an island in India's Andaman and Nicobar Islands
 Malacca, Car Nicobar, a village in India
 Malacca, Nancowry, a village in India
 Malacca Banks, sandbanks in India's Gulf of Khambhat

Other uses
 Battle of Malacca (disambiguation)
 , three ships
 Malacca International Airport, Batu Berendam, Malacca, Malaysia
 Malacca FM, a regional Malay language radio station in Malacca City
 Malacca, the stem of the rattan palm, used for making walking sticks and umbrella sticks
 Malacca tree, a common name for Phyllanthus emblica

See also
 Malaka (disambiguation)
 Malakka (Kerala), a village in Kerala, India
 Malakas, a Greek slang word